

Youth solo sailing circumnavigations

Abby Sunderland attempted on her boat Wild Eyes through a planned easterly circumnavigation in 2010 but did not complete due to bad weather on the remote area northeast of Kerguelen Islands.

Since the Jesse Martin voyage, records claimed for the youngest person to circumnavigate the world are not recognized by the World Sailing Speed Record Council, nor by any other formal council. Therefore, the strict route requirements of the WSSRC are not being followed for this list, and it is deemed sufficient for the sailors to cross all longitudes and the equator, before crossing their own path again.

Unassisted sailing essentially means that the sail boat does not dock in harbors, or with other boats and does not get equipment from outside during the voyage.

See also

 Circumnavigation
 List of circumnavigations
 Around the world sailing record

References